Immigration reform is change to the current immigration policy of a country. In its strict definition, reform means "to change into an improved form or condition, by amending or removing faults or abuses". In the political sense, "immigration reform" may include promoted, expanded, or open immigration, as well as reduced or eliminated immigration.

See also
Immigration reform in the United States
Immigration reform in the United Kingdom
 Immigration detention in Australia

References

Immigration law